This is a list of Romanian exonyms for cities, towns and villages located in Ukraine.

Chernivtsi Oblast

Chernivtsi Raion
Bagrynivka Bahrinești
Bairaky Mogoșești
Bancheny Bănceni
Bila Krynytsia Fântâna Albă
Bukivka Poieni
Chahor Ceahor
Cherepkivtsi Cerepcăuți
Chernivtsi Cernăuți
Chernova Dibrova Dumbrava Roșie
Diakіvtsі Probotești
Dymka Dimca
Gorbivtsi Gărbăuți
Hertsa Herța
Hlyboka Adâncata
Hodynivka Godinești
Horbova Horbova
Kamyanka Petriceni
Karapchiv Carapciu
Khriatska Hreațca
Korchivtsi Corcești
Koroviya Corovia
Krupianske Pasat
Kulykіvka Culiceni
Kupka Cupca
Kut Cotul Bainschi
Lukovytsia Lucovița, Hodynivka
Lukovytsia Lucovița
Lunka Lunca
Mala Buda Buda Mică
Mamornytsia Mamornița
Mikhaylivka Mihuceni
Mohylіvka Movila
Molnytsia Molnița
Molodiia Plaiul Cosminului
Nyzhni Synivtsi Sinăuții de Jos
Oprysheny Oprișeni
Ostrytsia Ostrița
Petrashivka Mihoreni
Petrychanka Petriceanca
Pіdvalne Becești
Polyana Poieni
Prosokyryany Prisăcăreni
Prosika Prosica
Pryvoroky Prevoroche
Radhospivka Vama
Slobidka Slobozia-Berlinți
Stanivtsi Stănești
Stary Vovchynets Volcineț
Sterche Stârcea
Sucheveny Suceveni
Tarashany Tărășeni
Terebleche Tereblecea
Ternavka Târnauca
Tsuren Țureni
Turiatka Tureatca
Valia Kuzmyna Valea Cosminului
Velyka Buda Buda Mare
Velykosillia Pilipăuți
Verkhni Synivtsi Sinăuții de Sus
Voloka Voloca pe Derelui
Yordaneshty Iordănești

Dnistrovskyi Raion
Anadoly Darabani
Ataky Atachi
Babyn Babin
Belovtsy Belăuți
Bernove Bârnova
Blyshchad Blișciadi
Bochkivtsi Bocicăuți
Brailikva Brăila
Burdiuh Burdiuh
Buzoystsia Buzovița
Cheponosy Ceponosa
Dankivtsi Dăncăuți
Dnistrivka Resteu-Atachi
Dolyniany Dolineni
Hordivtsi Gordeuți
Hrozyntsi Grozinți
Hrushivtsi Grușevița
Hryniachka Grineacica
Ivanivtsi Ianăuți
Kaplivka Capilauca
Kelmentsi Chelmenți
Kerstentsi Cristinești
Khotyn Hotin
Klishkivtsi Clișcăuți
Kolinkivtsi Colencăuți
Komariv Comarova
Konovka Cofa
Korneshty Cornești
Kozyriany Cozăreni
Krokva Crocva
Kruhlik Cruglic
Krutenky Tulbureni
Lenkivtsi Lencăuți
Livyntsi Levinți
Lukachivka Lucăceni
Maiorka Maiorca
Makarivka Macareanca
Malyntsi Malinți
Mlynky Mlinchi
Moshanets Moșaneți
Mykhailivka Mihăileanca
Nahoriany Nagoreni
Nedoboivtsi Nedăbăuți
Nelypivtsi Nelipăuți
Novoselytsia Noua Suliță
Orestivka Aresteuca
Oselivka Chișla-Nedjimeni
Pashkivtsi Pășcăuți
Perebykivtsi Perebicăuți
Perkivtsi Percăuți
Podvirivka Chișla-Zamjieva
Poliana Poiana
Pryhorodok Prigorodoc
Putryne Putrina
Rashkiv Rașcov
Rososhany Rosoșani
Rukshyn Rucșin
Rukhotyn Ruhotin
Sankivtsi Săncăuți
Shylivtsi Șilăuți
Skyrivtsi Șirăuții de Sus
Slobidka Slobozia-Varticăuți
Stavchany Stăuceni
Vartykivtsi Varticăuți
Vladychna Vlădicina
Vornychany Vorniceni
Voronovytsia Voronovița
Vovchynets Volcineți
Yarivka Hajdeu de Sus
Zarozhany Zarojani
Zelena Zelena
Zelena Lypa Teiul Verde

Kitsman Raion
Kitsman Coțmani
Luzhany Lujeni
Nepolokivtsi Nepolocăuți
Brusnytsia Berbești
Berehomet Berhomet pe Prut
Bila Bila
Borivtsi Borăuți
Kyseliv Chisălău
Khlivyshche Clivești
Klivodyn Clivodin
Striletskyi Kut Cotul-Vânători
Davydivtsi Davidești
Drachyntsi Drăcineț
Dubivtsi Dubăuți
Hlynytsia Hlinița
Yuzhynets Iujineț
Ivankivtsi Ivancăuți
Lashkivka Lașchiuca
Maliatyntsi Malatineți
Mamaivtsi Mămăești
Orshivtsi Orășeni
Oshykhliby Oșehlib
Nyzhni Stanivtsi Stăneștii de Jos
Verkhni Stanivtsi Stăneștii de Sus
Stavchany Stăuceni
Sukhoverkhiv Suhoverca
Shypyntsi Șipeniț
Shyshkivtsi Șișcăuți
Valiava Valeva
Burdei Bordei
Brusenky Brusenchi
Kalnivtsi Călinești
Novyi Kyseliv Chisălăul Nou
Chortoria Ciortoria
Klokichka Clocucica
Korostuvata Corostuvata
Novyi Drachyntsi Drăcineții Noi
Dibrova, Kitsman Raion Dumbrava
Havrylivtsi Gavrilești
Ostra Ostra
Piadykivtsi Piedicăuți
Revne Râvna
Revakivtsi Revacăuți
Vynohrad Vinograd
Vytylivka Viteluvca
Zeleniv Zeleneu

Novoselytsia Raion
Novoselytsia Noua Suliță
Balkivtsi Bălcăuți
Berestia Berestea
Boiany Boian
Hai Hlinița
Cherlenivka Cerlina Mare
Chornivka Cernăuca
Dynivtsi Dinăuți
Dovzhok Doljoc
Dranytsia Șendreni
Nehrintsi Negreni
Forosna Forostna
Kostychany Costiceni
Dumeny Dumeni
Novoivankivtsi Vancicăuții Mici
Koteleve Coteleu
Mahala Mahala
Buda Buda
Ostritsia Cotul Ostriței
Prut Prut
Malynivka Mălinești
Mamalyha Mămăliga
Koshuliani Coșuleni
Marshyntsi Marșenița
Nesvoia Nesfoaia
Podvirne Chișla-Salieva
Prypruttia Lehăceni-Boian
Boianivka Cotul Boianului
Ridkivtsi Rarancea
Rokytne Răchitna
Rynhach Rângaci
Shyshkivtsi Șișcăuți
Shcherbyntsi Șerbinți
Sloboda Slobozia Rarancei
Stalnivtsi Stălinești
Strointsi Stroești
Tarasivtsi Tărăsăuți
Toporivtsi Toporăuți
Vanchikivtsi Vancicăuții Mari
Vanchinets Vancineți
Zelenyi Hai Lehăcenii Tăutului
Zhylivka Sânger

Putyla Raion
Putyla Putila
Dovhopillia Câmpulung pe Ceremuș
Kyselytsi Chiselițeni
Kontiatyn Coniatin
Dykhtynets Dihtineț
Ust-Putyla Gura Putilei
Yablunytsia, Putyla Raion Iablonița
Marynychi Măreniceni
Ploska, Putyla Raion Plosca
Roztoky, Putyla Raion Răstoace
Serhii Sârghieni
Seliatyn Seletin
Shepit Șipotele Sucevei
Pidzakharychi Zahariceni
Andrekivske Andrechivsche
Byskiv Biscău
Biskiv Bischiv
Malyi Dykhtynets Dihtinețul Mic
Foshky Foșchi
Yamy Gropi
Halytsivka Halițivca
Holoshyna Holoșina
Khorovy Horova
Hreblyna-Dovhopillia Hreblina-Câmpulung
Hreblyna-Dykhtynetska Hreblina-Dihtineț
Hrobyshche Hrobișce
Nyzhnii Yalovets Ialovățul de Jos
Verkhnii Yalovets Ialovățul de Sus
Velykyi Lypovets Lipovețul Mare
Lustun Lustun
Mizhbrody Mejabrode
Okolena Ocolena
Parkulyna Parculina
Petrashi Petrășeni
Plai Plai
Plyta Plita
Ploshchi Ploșci
Poliakivske Poleachivsche
Rypen Râpeni
Ryzha Rija
Ruska Rusca
Samakova Samacova
Ruska Sărata
Sokolii Socolii
Stebni Stebni
Shpetki Șpetchi
Tesnytska Tesnițca
Toraky Torăceni
Tovarnytsia Tovarnițea
Vypchyna Vipcina
Zamohyla Zamoghila

Sokyriany Raion
Sokyriany Secureni
Bilousivka Beleusovca
Kobolchyn Cobâlceni
Korman Cormani
Kulishivka Culișcăuți
Hrubna Grubna
Hvizdivtsi Gvăzdăuți
Lomachyntsi Lomacineți
Lopativ Lopativ
Oleksiivka Mendicăuți
Mykhalkove Mihăileanca
Bratanivka Moldova
Ozheve Ojeva
Romankivtsi Romancăuți
Selyshche Seliștea
Serbychany Serbiceni
Shebutyntsi Șebutinți
Shyshkivtsi Șișcăuții Noi
Vasylivka Vasileuți
Vashkivtsi Vășcăuți
Vitrianka Vitreanca
Voloshkove Voloșcova
Halytsia Galițea
Novooleksiivka Mendicăuții Noi
Neporotove Neporotova
Pokrovka Pocrovca
Rozkopyntsi Respopini
Nova Sloboda Slobozia Nouă
Strumok Strumoc

Storozhynets Raion
Storozhynets Storojineț
Krasnoilsk Crasna-Ilschi
Banyliv Pidhirnyi Bănila pe Siret
Bobivtsi Bobești
Budenets Budineț
Cheresh Cireș
Chudei Ciudei
Davydivka Davideni
Kamiana Camena
Komarivtsi Comărești
Kostyntsi Costești
Mykhalcha Mihalcea
Dubove Dubova
Spaska Spasca
Zavoloka Zavoloca
Novi Broskivtsi Broscăuții Noi
Zabolottia Zabolotie
Nyzhni Petrivtsi Pătrăuții de Jos
Arshytsia Arșița
Panka Panca
Ropcha Ropcea
Sloboda-Komarivtsi Slobozia Comăreștilor
Sniachiv Sneci
Hlybochok Hlibacioc
Stara Krasnoshora Crăsnișoara Veche
Stara Zhadova Jadova Veche
Dibrivka Dumbrava
Kosovanka Cosovanca
Nova Zhadova Jadova Nouă
Stari Broskivtsi Broscăuții Vechi
Tysovets Tișăuți
Velykyi Kuchuriv Cuciurul Mare
Verkhni Petrivtsi Pătrăuții de Sus
Yizhivtsi Igești
Ursoia Ursoaia
Zrub-Komarivskyi Trei Movile

Vyzhnytsia Raion
Vyzhnytsia Vijnița
Vashkivtsi Vășcăuți
Berehomet Berhomet pe Siret
Bahna Bahna
Banyliv Bănila pe Ceremuș
Karapchiv Carapciu pe Ceremuș
Chornohuzy Ciornohuzi
Chereshnka Cireșel
Ispas Ispas
Lukivtsi Lucavăț
Myhove Mihova
Miliieve Milie
Sloboda-Banyliv Slobozia Bănilei
Dolishnii Shepit Șipotele pe Siret
Vyzhenka Vijnicioara
Korytne Vilaucea
Zamostia Zamostea
Babyne Babin
Berezhnytsia, Vyzhnytsia Raion Berejnița
Berezhonka Berejonca
Kybaky Chibachi
Falkiv Falcău
Lopushna Lăpușna
Lekechi Lecheci
Lypovany Lipoveni
Maidan-Ispas Maidan-Ispas
Maidan-Lukivtsi Maidan-Lucavăț
Serednii Maidan Maidanul de Mijlo
Velyke Mega
Vakhnivtsi Vahnăuți
Valy Valea
Vovchynets Volcineț 
Voloka Voloca pe Ceremuș
Zarichchia Zaricicea

Zastavna Raion
Zastavna Zastavna
Kostryzhivka Costrijeni
Babyn Babin
Balamutivka Balamutca
Boianchuk Bosânceni
Kadubivtsi Cadobești
Chunkiv Cincău
Khreshchatyk Crișceatec
Malyi Kuchuriv Cuciurul Mic
Kulivtsi Culeuți
Dobrynivtsi Dobronăuți
Doroshivtsi Doroșăuți
Horoshivtsi Horoșăuți
Yurkivtsi Iurcăuți
Mytkiv Mitcău
Mosorivka Mosoreni
Vikno Ocna
Onut Onut
Chornyi Potik Pârâul Negru
Pohorilivka Pohorlăuți
Prylypche Prelipcea
Repuzhyntsi Răpujineț
Rzhavyntsi Rjavinți
Samushyn Sămușeni
Horishni Sherivtsi Șerăuții de Sus
Shubranets Șubrănești
Tovtry Tăuteni
Bridok Vadul Nistrului
Vasyliv Vasilău
Vaslovivtsi Vaslăuți
Verbivtsi Verbăuți
Verenchanka Vrânceni
Zadubrivka Zadobruvca
Zveniachyn Zvineace
Yablunivka Iablunivca
Yosypivka (Iosipovca)
Rudka Rudca
Stepanivka Ștefănești
Vymushiv Vimușiv

Romanian language
Languages of Ukraine